The 1992 CONCACAF Under-20 Championship was held in Canada. It also served as qualification for the 1993 FIFA World Youth Championship.

Teams
The following teams qualified for the tournament:

Round 1

Group A

Group B
In this group, Honduras qualified for the final round as best group runners-up.

Group C

Final round

Qualification to World Youth Championship
The two best performing teams qualified for the 1993 FIFA World Youth Championship.

See also
 1992 CONCACAF U-20 Tournament qualifying

External links
Results by RSSSF
Results by CONCACAF

CONCACAF Under-20 Championship
1992 in youth association football